Aliabad-e Khazayi-ye Aliabad-e Marki (also Romanized as ‘Alīābād-e Khazāyī-ye ‘Alīābād-e Mārḵī) is a village in Hoseynabad Rural District, Esmaili District, Anbarabad County, Kerman Province, Iran. At the 2006 census, its population was 129, in 28 families.

References 

Populated places in Anbarabad County